Ray Kennedy (1951–2021) was an English footballer for Arsenal and Liverpool.

Ray or Raymond Kennedy may also refer to:

 Raymond Kennedy (novelist) (1934–2008), American novelist
 Raymond Louis Kennedy (1946–2014), singer-songwriter and musician
 Raymond M. Kennedy (1891–1976), guiding light and architect of the Grauman's Chinese Theater
 Ray Kennedy (country singer) (born 1954), country music artist
 Ray Kennedy (pianist) (1957–2015), American jazz pianist
 Ray Kennedy (journalist) (born 1970), Irish journalist
 Ray Kennedy (baseball) (1895–1969), American baseball player, scout and executive